Vocabularius ex quo is a 15th century Latin-German dictionary compiled by the Bechtermünz Brothers of Eltville am Rhein, with the assistance of an ageing and bankrupt Johannes Gutenberg. The manuscript consists of two complementary parts, one from 1421 and the other from 1450. More than 270 surviving manuscripts and some fifty editions remain. It was the most commonly used late medieval alphabetical dictionary in Germany. It dates from the late 14th century and, spreading all over the then German speaking countries, and kept being copied until the last decades of the 15th century.
It was meant by its compiler-author to enable the middle class to read and literally understand the Scriptures and other Latin texts.

Edition 
 Frühneuhochdeutsches Glossenwörterbuch. Index zum deutschen Wortgut des ›Vocabolarius ex quo‹. Auf Grund der Vorarbeiten von Erltraud Auer, Regina Frisch, Reinhard Pawis und Hans-Jürgen Stahl unter Mitwirkung von Markus Stock herausgegeben von Klaus Grubmüller. Niemeyer, Tübingen 2001 (= Texte und Textgeschichte. Vol. 27).

References 

Latin dictionaries
German dictionaries
15th-century manuscripts

15th-century Latin books